Evil, also known as Το Κακό in Greek, is 2005 Greek zombie horror film. The film is notable for being the first Greek zombie movie.

Plot
Three construction workers discover an abandoned cave and are promptly attacked by a creature not shown on screen. Afterwards, the population of the city of Athens is turned into zombies, while the last remaining group of people attempt to survive.

Cast
 Meletis Georgiadis as Meletis
 Argiris Thanasoulas as Argyris
 Pepi Moschovakou as Marina
 Stavroula Thomopoulou as Dimitra
 Mary Tsoni as Jenny
 Andreas Kontopoulos as Lieutenant Vakirtzis
 Nikos Sambalis as Andreas
 Yannis Katsambas as Giannis
 Daphne Larouni as Dafni

References

External links

2005 horror films
2005 films
Greek zombie films
2000s action horror films
2000s comedy horror films
Greek horror films
2005 comedy films